Chew Yiwei (born 16 October 1995 in Selangor) is a Malaysian diver. He competed at the Commonwealth Games in 2014 and 2018, the Asian Games in 2014 and 2018, and the Southeast Asian Games in 2013, 2015, 2017, 2019 and 2021.

External links
 
 
 
 

1995 births
Living people
People from Selangor
Malaysian sportspeople of Chinese descent
Malaysian male divers
Commonwealth Games competitors for Malaysia
Divers at the 2014 Commonwealth Games
Divers at the 2018 Commonwealth Games
Divers at the 2022 Commonwealth Games
Asian Games medalists in diving
Divers at the 2014 Asian Games
Divers at the 2018 Asian Games
Asian Games bronze medalists for Malaysia
Medalists at the 2014 Asian Games
Medalists at the 2018 Asian Games
Southeast Asian Games gold medalists for Malaysia
Southeast Asian Games bronze medalists for Malaysia
Southeast Asian Games medalists in diving
Competitors at the 2013 Southeast Asian Games
Competitors at the 2015 Southeast Asian Games
Competitors at the 2017 Southeast Asian Games
Competitors at the 2019 Southeast Asian Games
Competitors at the 2021 Southeast Asian Games
21st-century Malaysian people